Jeffery Cohelan (June 24, 1914 – February 15, 1999) was an American politician who served six terms as a United States representative from California from 1959 to 1971.

Biography 
He was born in San Francisco, California and attended the public schools and San Mateo Junior College. He earned his B.A. from the University of California, Berkeley in Economics in 1950. He was a Fulbright research scholar at Leeds and Oxford Universities in England in 1953 and 1954.

He worked driving a milk truck from 1935, and was the secretary-treasurer  (1942–~1958) of the Milk Drivers and Dairy Employees, Local 302, Alameda and Contra Costa Counties. In the 1958 election, he campaigned from a milk truck and was elected to Congress.  He was a consultant to the University of California Institute of Industrial Relations.

Cohelan was a member of Berkeley Welfare Commission 1949-1953, the Berkeley City Council 1955-1958, and San Francisco Council on Foreign Relations. He was elected as a Democrat to the Eighty-sixth and to the five succeeding Congresses, from 1959 to 1971. He was known as a Johnson liberal for his support of progressive programs, but also American involvement in the Vietnam War.

In 1966, he faced a tough primary challenge from Ramparts magazine editor Robert Scheer, who was supported by local activists from the civil-rights and emerging anti-war movement.

His previous support for the war helped lead to Cohelan's defeat in the 1970 primary by Berkeley City Councilman Ron Dellums. He was executive director (1970–1979) of a trade association of Health Maintenance Organizations, Group Health Association of America. After retirement, he enjoyed cooking and sang in the All Saint's Episcopal Church choir.  He resided in Washington, D.C. until his death at home February 15, 1999.

University of Oklahoma has papers from his congressional office.

References

External links
Jeffery Cohelan Collection and Photograph Collection at the Carl Albert Center
 
 Jeffery Cohelan Former U.S. Representative from California's 7th District , 1961-1971 (Democrat)  Govtrack

1914 births
1999 deaths
Democratic Party members of the United States House of Representatives from California
Politicians from San Francisco
UC Berkeley College of Letters and Science alumni
American trade union leaders
20th-century American politicians
Activists from California